Galena Township is one of twenty-one townships in LaPorte County, Indiana. As of the 2010 census, its population was 1,899 and it contained 967 housing units.

Galena Township was established in 1836.

Communities
Birchim is an unincorporated community located at  within the southeast portion of the township.
Hesston is an unincorporated community located at  within the northwest portion of the township. The Hesston Steam Museum is located in Hesston.

Geography

References

External links
 Indiana Township Association
 United Township Association of Indiana

Townships in LaPorte County, Indiana
Townships in Indiana